Novi Radio Bihać or Novi Radio is a Bosnian local commercial radio station, broadcasting from Bihać, Bosnia and Herzegovina. Formatted as contemporary hit radio, this radio station broadcasts a variety of programs such as music, short local news and morning talk shows.

Program is mainly produced in Bosnian language and it was intended for the local audience in Bihać and Cazin area. In the rest of the country, station is available online or via IPTV platform Moja TV on channel 184.

Estimated number of potential (terrestrial) listeners is around 89,692 although it is also  available in a part of the Lika-Senj County in neighboring Croatia.

Frequencies
The program is currently broadcast at two frequencies:

 Bihać 
 Cazin

References

External links 
 www.noviradiobihac.com 
 Communications Regulatory Agency of Bosnia and Herzegovina

See also 
List of radio stations in Bosnia and Herzegovina

Bihać
Cazin
Bihać
Radio stations established in 2006